Marcello Bertinetti (born 21 July 1952) is an Italian fencer. He competed in the individual and team épée events at the 1976 Summer Olympics.

References

1952 births
Living people
Italian male fencers
Olympic fencers of Italy
Fencers at the 1976 Summer Olympics